The Storm Is Coming is a 1993 Italian comedy film written and directed by Daniele Luchetti.

For her performance in this film Marina Confalone won the  David di Donatello for Best Supporting Actress.

Cast   
Diego Abatantuono: Damiano Fortezza
Margherita Buy: Eugenia Fontana
Silvio Orlando: Mario Solitudine
Marina Confalone: Emma Fontana
Stefania Montorsi: Esmeralda Fontana
Angela Finocchiaro: Concettina
Eros Pagni: Gerolamo Adelante

References

External links

The Storm Is Coming at Variety Distribution

1993 comedy films
1993 films
Italian comedy films
Films directed by Daniele Luchetti
1990s Italian-language films
1990s Italian films